The Singles Album may refer to:

The Singles Album (UB40 album) (1982)
The Singles Album (Jimi Hendrix album) (1983)
The Shirley Bassey Singles Album (1975)

See also
The Singles (disambiguation)
The Singles Collection (disambiguation)